Take Two with Phineas and Ferb is a short-form spin-off series from Phineas and Ferb that premiered on Disney Channel on December 3, 2010. The series revolves around Phineas and Ferb interviewing live action celebrities, a premise which bears similarities to that of Cartoon Network's late-night animated talk show Space Ghost Coast to Coast on Adult Swim. Only one season of the series was produced. The first ten episodes of the series are currently available to stream on Disney+.

Cast

Vincent Martella as Phineas Flynn
Thomas Sangster as Ferb Fletcher
Ashley Tisdale as Candace Flynn
Dee Bradley Baker as Perry, "Agent P"
Dan Povenmire as Dr. Doofenshmirtz
Alyson Stoner as Isabella
Maulik Pancholy as Baljeet
Bobby Gaylor as Buford

Episodes

Australian version
After airing the first season in Australia, it was renewed for a second season with Australian stars such as Rove McManus and Jessica Mauboy.

Worldwide release dates

International guests
 Local guests have appeared in several countries outside the United States

References

External links
 

Phineas and Ferb
2010s American animated television series
2010 American television series debuts
2011 American television series endings
American children's animated comedy television series
American animated television spin-offs
American television series with live action and animation
Animated television series about brothers
Animated television series about children
Disney Channel original programming
Television series by Disney Television Animation
Television series created by Dan Povenmire and Jeff "Swampy" Marsh